Cafeteria may refer to:

Cafeteria, a room for eating in
Cafeteria (bicosoecid), a genus of bicosoecid, a group of unicellular flagellates
Cafeteria roenbergensis, the type species of the genus.

See also 
Cafe (disambiguation)
Coffeehouse (disambiguation)